Christian Samba (born 26 March 1971) is a Congolese former professional footballer who played as a goalkeeper.

International career
He was a member of the Congo national football team from 1991 to 2000.

External links

1971 births
Living people
Association football goalkeepers
Republic of the Congo footballers
Republic of the Congo international footballers
1992 African Cup of Nations players
2000 African Cup of Nations players
Africa Sports d'Abidjan players
Pacy Ménilles RC players
Republic of the Congo expatriate footballers
Expatriate footballers in Ivory Coast
Republic of the Congo expatriate sportspeople in France
Expatriate footballers in France